Isatoic anhydride is an organic compound derived from anthranilic acid.  A white solid, it is prepared by reaction of anthranilic acid with phosgene.

Reactions
Hydrolysis gives carbon dioxide and anthranilic acid.  Alcoholysis proceeds similarly, affording the ester:
C6H4C2O3NH  +  ROH  →   C6H4(CO2R)(NH2)  +  CO2
Amines also effect ring-opening.  Active methylene compounds and carbanions replace oxygen giving hydroxyquinolinone derivatives.  Deprotonation followed by alkylation gives the N-substituted derivatives.  Sodium azide gives the benzimidazolone via the isocyanate.  Isatoic anhydride is used as a blowing agent in the polymer industry, an application that exploits its tendency to release CO2.

Isatoic anhydride has also been reported to be used as a precursor for the synthesis of methaqualone and related 4-quinazolinone based pharmaceutical drugs.

References

Carboxylic anhydrides